The Wheat Bowl was the only National Association of Intercollegiate Athletics endorsed pre-season bowl game that operated from 1995 until 2006.  The Wheat Bowl Football Classic was headquartered in the Central Kansas town of Ellinwood and was played in nearby Great Bend annually as the kickoff for the NAIA season.

In 1995 and 1996, the game was played as a "post-season" game.  Beginning in 1997, the Wheat Bowl Football Classic was successfully switched to a pre-season contest to eliminate several potential obstacles: the possibility of inclement weather, conflicts with Kansas State University and University of Kansas home games as well as conflicts with high school playoffs.

Due to facilities not being available, no game was played in 2007.  The next game was scheduled for August 23, 2008 at the newly renovated Great Bend Memorial Stadium.  According to the bowl website, it appears that the game was not played as originally scheduled and the bowl is now considered defunct.  The College Fanz First Down Classic preseason bowl began in 2007 and was considered the kick-off of the NAIA season until its final game in 2011.

Game results

Community College

There was a game called the "Wheat Bowl" played between Kansas Community Colleges from 1948 to 1950.  Although the name is the same, the organization was completely different.  This particular bowl is now defunct.

References

Defunct college football bowls
American football in Kansas